Daniel Fohr, born at Heidelberg in 1801, first studied science, which he afterwards abandoned for the art of painting. After studying some time by himself, he went to Munich in 1829, and then to the Tyrol. He was court painter to the Grand-Duke of Baden, and died at Baden-Baden in 1862. There are by him in the Gallery at Carlsruhe:
Mazeppa. 1836.
A View of the Konigsee, near Berchtesgaden. 1836.
The Steinberg, near Berchtesgaden. 1837.
The Four Seasons, representing four Epochs of German History.

See also
 List of German painters

References

External links

1801 births
1862 deaths
19th-century German painters
German male painters
Court painters
Artists from Heidelberg
19th-century German male artists